Rectal vein can refer to:
 Superior rectal vein (superior hemorrhoidal vein)
 Middle rectal veins (middle hemorrhoidal vein)
 Inferior rectal veins (inferior hemorrhoidal veins)